21 Years On  is a live album by The Dubliners. Recorded at the National Concert Hall, Dublin in 1983, this was the first album by The Dubliners to feature Seán Cannon, who joined the group when Luke Kelly could no longer perform regularly due to a brain tumour.  The album was released by Raidió Teilifís Éireann, who also made a film of the concert. Cellist Nigel Warren-Green also features.

Track listing

Side One:
 "Fairmoye Lassies and Sporting Paddy"
 "Finnegan's Wake"
 "Banks of the Roses"
 "The Button Pusher"
 "Prodigal Son"

Side Two:
 "Bantry Girls Lament"
 "Sweet Georgia Brown"
 "Kimmage"
 "Seven Drunken Nights"
 "Flop Eared Mule"

Personnel
Ronnie Drew
Barney McKenna
John Sheahan
Sean Cannon
 Bill Keating – television producer
 Philip Begley – musical associate
 Bill Murphy – sleeve designer
 John Rowe – photographer

The Dubliners live albums
1983 live albums
Raidió Teilifís Éireann live albums